Louis-François Roubiliac's statue of George Frideric Handel is a work of 1738 in the Victoria and Albert Museum, London. It was commissioned by the impresario Jonathan Tyers for his famous pleasure gardens in London, Vauxhall Gardens.

The composer is shown in the guise of Orpheus, holding a lyre. Despite the classical allusion, he wears informal contemporary dress: a soft cap, a long shirt open at the neck, a full loose gown, and slippers, one of which lies beneath his right foot. His pose is also casual. He is seated cross-legged, leaning on a pile of bound scores of his works, including Alexander's Feast, which was completed the same month the statue was finished. The statue is unprecedented, for not only was the sitter portrayed with startling informality, but it was the first life-size marble depicting a living artist. Until this date such public statues were erected only for monarchs, noblemen or military leaders. Roubiliac was a native of France, although his known surviving work was executed in England. Handel is his earliest known independent sculpture. When it went on display in Vauxhall Gardens in 1738 it proved an immediate success, helping to establish Roubiliac as one of the leading sculptors in England.

Roubiliac was trained in Lyon, later working in Dresden under a leading Baroque sculptor, Balthasar Permoser (1651–1732), and then studying in Paris before moving to London in about 1730. All his known surviving works were executed in Britain. He specialised in portrait busts and funerary monuments, and was renowned for his handling of marble, particularly his creation of subtle surface textures.

Bibliography

External links
 

Sculptures of the Victoria and Albert Museum
Marble sculptures
Handel
1738 sculptures
George Frideric Handel